The following is a list of notable vendors in the business of licensing IP cores

Analog-to-Digital Converters 
 S3 Group
 Cadence Design Systems
 Cosmic Circuits
 Dolphin Integration
 Synopsys

Broadband modem and error correction 
 Cadence Design Systems
 CEVA, Inc.
 IMEC
 On2 Technologies (through acquisition of Hantro)
 Synopsys (through acquisition of Virage Logic)
 Tensilica (now part of Cadence Design Systems)

Digital to Analog Converters 
 S3 Group
 Cadence Design Systems
 Cosmic Circuits (now part of Cadence Design Systems)
 Dolphin Integration

Digital Signal Processors 

Synopsys - ARC
 Tensilica - Xtensa (now part of Cadence Design Systems)

DRAM

DRAM controllers 
 Actel
 Altera
 Arm
 Barco Silex
 Cadence Design Systems (through acquisition of Denali Software)
 Faraday Technology
 Lattice Semiconductor
 Rambus
 Synopsys
 Xilinx

DRAM PHYs 
 Arm
 Cadence Design Systems (through acquisition of Denali Software)
 Synopsys (through acquisition of Virage Logic)

High-Bandwidth Memory - HBM PHYs 
 eSilicon
 Rambus
 Synopsys

Hybrid Memory Cube - HMC Controllers 

 Open-Silicon 
 University of Heidelberg

Communication IP

Network-on-Chip (NoC) / On-Chip Interconnect 
 Arteris IP
 Arm

Bluetooth SW Stack, Link Layer and PHY 
 Arm (through acquisition of Dicentric and Sunrise Micro Devices)

Ethernet PHY 
 Arm (through acquisition of Artisan Components)
 Cadence Design Systems

V by One 
 Socionext - HV Series

General purpose microprocessors 
 Arm - Arm Cortex and Neoverse processors
 CEVA, Inc. - CEVA-X DSP
 Dolphin Integration - 8051, 80251
 eSi-RISC - eSi-RISC
 Freescale and others - ColdFire
 IBM and others - PowerPC
 Infineon Technologies - Tricore
 Imagination Technologies - MIPS
 OpenCores - OpenRISC
 Renesas - SuperH
 RISC-V
 Socionext - Fujitsu_FR
 Sun Microsystems and others - OpenSPARC
 Synopsys - ARC
 Tensilica - Xtensa (now part of Cadence Design Systems)
 Western Design Center - 6502, 65816, 65xx
 Xilinx - MicroBlaze

Graphic Processing Units (GPUs) 

 NVidia

HDMI 
 Silicon Image Inc.
 Synopsys

ISP 
 Silicon Image Inc.
 Socionext - Milbeaut

I/O pad libraries 
 Arm (through acquisition of Artisan Components)
Faraday Technology
 Synopsys
 TSMC

On-chip SRAMs 
 Arm (through acquisition of Artisan Components)
 Dolphin Integration
 Synopsys (through acquisition of Virage Logic)
 eSilicon

Phase Locked Loops (PLLs) 
 S3 Group
 Arm (through acquisition of Artisan Components)
 Cadence Design Systems
 Cosmic Circuits
 CEVA, Inc.
 TSMC

Power Management 
 S3 Group
 Cosmic Circuits
 Dolphin Integration

Serial ATA (SATA) controllers 
CEVA, Inc.
 Synopsys Inc.

Standard cell libraries 
 Arm (through acquisition of Artisan Components)
 Dolphin Integration
Faraday Technology
 Synopsys
 NanGate

Video processors and computer graphics 

 Arm (through acquisition of Falanx and Logipard)
 Vivante Corporation （offers GPU IP solutions for applications in the mobile, consumer, automotive, embedded, real time/mission critical, and home entertainment markets.）
 CEVA, Inc.
 Chips&Media Specializes in video codecs, image signal processing, and deep learning-based computer vision system (super-resolution). 
Google (through acquisition of On2 Technologies)
 Imagination Technologies
 Silicon Image Inc.
 Socionext - HEVC/H.265, SEERIS 2.5D Graphics IP

References

Electronic design
Semiconductor IP cores